The North River is a  stream in Bedford Township in southeastern Michigan, the United States. It is a tributary of Flat Creek, which flows northeast to Little Lake Creek, a tributary of Lake Erie.

See also
List of rivers of Michigan

References

Michigan  Streamflow Data from the USGS

Rivers of Michigan
Rivers of Monroe County, Michigan
Tributaries of Lake Erie